Mohammad Hamza (born 18 December 1991) is a Pakistani first-class cricketer who plays for Lahore cricket team.

References

External links
 

1991 births
Living people
Pakistani cricketers
Lahore cricketers
Cricketers from Lahore